The 2009–10 Women's CEV Champions League was an international volleyball club competition for elite clubs throughout Europe.

Teams of the 2009–10
Participants:

Main phase

Pool A

|}
December 1–3, 2009

|}
December 8–9, 2009

|}
December 16–17, 2009

|}
January 6–7, 2010

|}
January 12–13, 2010

|}
January 19, 2010

|}

Pool B

|}
December 3, 2009

|}
December 8–10, 2009

|}
December 15–17, 2009

|}
January 5–6, 2010

|}
January 13–14, 2010

|}
January 19, 2010

|}

Pool C

|}
December 1–3, 2009

|}
December 9, 2009

|}
December 15–17, 2009

|}
January 5–6, 2010

|}
January 12–14, 2010

|}
January 19, 2010

|}

Pool D

|}
December 1–3, 2009

|}
December 10, 2009

|}
December 15–17, 2009

|}
January 6–7, 2010

|}
January 13, 2010

|}
January 19, 2010

|}

Play-off 12

|}

First leg
February 9–11, 2010

|}

Second leg
February 16–18, 2010

|}

Play-off 6

|}

First leg
March 2–4, 2010

|}

Second leg
March 10–11, 2010

|}

Final four
The 2010 Final Four April 3–4, 2010 were played at Cannes, France.

Semi-final
April 3, 2010

|}

Third place play-off
April 4, 2010

|}

Final
April 4, 2010

|}

Final standing

Awards
MVP:  Francesca Piccinini (Volley Bergamo)
Best scorer:  Yekaterina Gamova (Fenerbahçe Acıbadem)
Best spiker:  Nadia Centoni (RC Cannes)
Best server:  Nataša Osmokrović (Fenerbahçe Acıbadem)
Best blocker:  Victoria Ravva (RC Cannes)
Best receiver:  Antonella Del Core (Volley Bergamo)
Best setter:  Eleonora Lo Bianco (Volley Bergamo)
Best libero:  Enrica Merlo (Volley Bergamo)

References

External links
Official site

CEV Women's Champions League
CEV Women's Champions League
CEV Women's Champions League